Cara Kim McGuinness (born March 1985) is a British Labour Party politician who has been the police and crime commissioner (PCC) for Northumbria since 2019 and she was re-elected in 2021.

Early life and career 
McGuinness was born in Newcastle upon Tyne and attended Gosforth High School. In 2006 she graduated from Newcastle University where she studied History. Prior to entering politics McGuinness worked professionally in a number of sectors including finance, universities and charities.

McGuinness was elected to represent the Lemington ward on Newcastle City Council in 2015, before joining the authority's cabinet in 2016 as executive member for culture, sport and public health.

McGuinness became the Northumbria Police and Crime Commissioner in a by-election on 18 July 2019, succeeding Dame Vera Baird and the acting commissioner, Ruth Durham, following Baird leaving the role to become Victims' Commissioner. She was retained the role following an election on 6 May 2021.

References

External links
 Page on Northumbria-PCC 

1985 births
Living people
Police and crime commissioners in England
Labour Party police and crime commissioners
Councillors in Tyne and Wear
Women councillors in England
21st-century British women politicians
Alumni of Newcastle University
Politicians from Newcastle upon Tyne